Mehdi Monajati (born 29 June 1947) is a retired Iranian footballer and Coach.

Club career
Monajati started his professional football career with Pas Tehran in his homeland in Tehran. He played his whole football career with  Pas Tehran playing with the team for 15 years. In five of his career with Pas he played was a Team meli player.

International career 
Monajati debuted for the Iran national football team on 13 September 1969 in a friendly match against Pakistan which ended 4-2 victory for Iran. He played his next two games against Turkey. Monajati then debuted his first FIFA tournament by competing against Denmark in 1972 Summer Olympics which ended a 0-4 loss. He also played three 1974 FIFA World cup qualifying matches which two of them was a win for Iran, in those three matches he did manage to score a goal against North Korea. His 15th and last match was a friendly match against Czechoslovakia which ended a 0-1 loss.

Management career 
Monajati was appointed as Team meli Head Coach in 1989, the job last only months after he just managed 3 matches, his side beat Thailand 3-0 but losing to China 0-2 in Shenyang but they later beat them 3-2 in Tehran. He left the Iranian national team after he failed to qualify Iran for the 1990 FIFA World Cup.

Career statistics

International goals

References

1947 births
Living people
Iranian footballers
Iran international footballers
Olympic football managers of Iran
Olympic footballers of Iran
Footballers at the 1972 Summer Olympics
1972 AFC Asian Cup players
Association football defenders
Iranian football managers
Esteghlal Ahvaz F.C. managers